Spencer Scott Davis (born November 29, 1998) is an American professional stock car racing driver who last competed part-time in the NASCAR Camping World Truck Series, driving the No. 11 Toyota Tundra for his own team Spencer Davis Motorsports.

Racing career

Early years
Davis began to race in the go-kart ranks when he was six years old. From there, he progressed into late model cars and trucks. He won many championships around the Southeast United States. In 2014, aged 15, Davis ran the full NASCAR Whelen Southern Modified Tour schedule with backing from Coors Light. He ran a partial schedule in both the Southern Modified Tour and the main NASCAR Whelen Modified Tour in 2015 while also driving a partial NASCAR K&N Pro Series West schedule.

Developmental series
After finding limited success in modifieds, Davis transitioned to the NASCAR K&N Pro Series East in 2015, driving for NTS Motorsports. After a restricted schedule that year, he found a ride with Ranier Racing with MDM for the 2016 season. Davis found victory lane for the first time at Dominion Raceway in May of that year. The deal with Ranier eventually collapsed, and Davis spent the remainder of the year driving for his family team, Jefferson Pitts Racing and Hattori Racing Enterprises. He was also named to the 2016–2017 NASCAR Next class.

On February 11, 2017, Davis signed with Venturini Motorsports to run seven ARCA Racing Series events in 2017 after testing with the team at Daytona International Speedway. His first race was at Talladega Superspeedway. After scoring a top-five in his first race, Davis found the top ten in three of his other six starts. He also ran premier late model events.

Balancing a NASCAR Camping World Truck Series schedule in 2018, Davis wound up running a partial schedule in the K&N East for Danny Watts Racing, which operated in conjunction with Rette Jones Racing. Expanding on that, Davis and RJR announced a full K&N East slate for 2019. At World Wide Technology Raceway in August, Davis earned his first win with RJR and first in three-plus years, passing Sam Mayer on a late green-white-checkered restart.

NASCAR
On January 23, 2018, it was announced that Davis would compete for Kyle Busch Motorsports, splitting time between the team's Nos. 4 and 51 entries. as part of the announcement, he was named as the driver of the No. 51 in four races and the No. 4 for a race, including the first three races of the season between the Nos. 51 and the 4. In his first race at Daytona International Speedway, Davis posted a seventh-place finish.

In 2019, Davis ran a limited slate with K&N team Rette Jones Racing but also joined Niece Motorsports for the summer race at Chicagoland Speedway in the Truck Series.

For 2020, Davis started his own team, Spencer Davis Motorsports. The team competed in most of the races during the first half of the 2020 NASCAR Gander RV & Outdoors Truck Series season, fielding the No. 11 Toyota with Davis behind the wheel. On August 6, Davis revealed that he had tested positive for COVID-19 and would miss the Henry Ford Health System 200, scheduled for the following day.

In January 2021, Spencer Davis Motorsports announced Davis would run the full Truck season in the No. 11. On March 20, it was announced that Davis acquired the owner's points of NEMCO Motorsports. After failing to qualify at Daytona, they were not entered into the Daytona RC. The team still wants to run a majority of the schedule, in which they did with Bubba Wallace at Bristol Dirt, Camden Murphy for COTA and Clay Greenfield for  2 races.

Spotting
During 2019, Davis dipped his toe into spotting, helping Niece Motorsports driver Kyle Benjamin in the Gander Outdoors Truck Series.

Personal life
Davis was homeschooled in order to maintain a flexible racing schedule. Spencer Davis grew up in Dawsonville, Georgia, the son of Scott Davis and Cynthia Davis. His father, Scott Davis, runs a poultry equipment business in Dahlonega.

Motorsports career results

NASCAR
(key) (Bold – Pole position awarded by qualifying time. Italics – Pole position earned by points standings or practice time. * – Most laps led.)

Camping World Truck Series

K&N Pro Series East

K&N Pro Series West

Whelen Modified Tour

Whelen Southern Modified Tour

 Season still in progress 
 Ineligible for series points

ARCA Racing Series

References

External links
 
 

1998 births
Living people
Sportspeople from the Atlanta metropolitan area
NASCAR drivers
ARCA Menards Series drivers
Racing drivers from Georgia (U.S. state)
People from Dawsonville, Georgia
Kyle Busch Motorsports drivers